Stéphane Solomenko (born November 14, 1960) is a former professional footballer who played as a striker.

Solomenko had a three-year spell with Olympique Lyonnais, a few years before his brother, Philippe, signed with the club.

References

External links
Stéphane Solomenko profile at chamoisfc79.fr

1960 births
Living people
French footballers
Association football forwards
Olympique Lyonnais players
Chamois Niortais F.C. players
CS Sedan Ardennes players
Ligue 1 players
Quimper Kerfeunteun F.C. players
Ligue 2 players
Olympique Saint-Quentin players
US Orléans players
FC Montceau Bourgogne players
People from Oullins
Sportspeople from Lyon Metropolis
Footballers from Auvergne-Rhône-Alpes